Donald Douglas Shaw (June 25, 1834 – December 29, 1859) was an American politician.

He was born on June 25, 1834, in Hamden, Delaware County, New York, the son of Donald Shaw.

He graduated from Yale University in 1856.  He studied law in Albany, New York and in Delhi, New York.

In November 1859, he was elected a member of the New York State Assembly, but died on December 29, 1859, in Hamden, before the commencement of the session.

References

Members of the New York State Assembly
People from Delaware County, New York
Yale University alumni
1834 births
1859 deaths
19th-century American politicians